The 2010–11 NBL season was the 28th season for the Melbourne Tigers in the NBL. The Tigers went into this season without the experience of former captain Chris Anstey and fellow ex-boomer Sam Mackinnon as the pair retired at the end of the 2009–10 NBL season.

Off-season

Additions

Subtractions

Roster

Depth chart

Regular season

Ladder 
This is the ladder at the end of season, before the finals. The top 4 teams qualified for the finals series.

The NBL tie-breaker system as outlined in the NBL Rules and Regulations states that in the case of an identical win–loss record, the results in games played between the teams will determine order of seeding.

Game log 

|- style="background-color:#fcc;"
| 1
| 15 October
| Sydney
| L 68–84
| Luke Nevill (17)
| Luke Nevill (12)
| Cameron Tragardh (5)
| State Netball Hockey Centre
| 0–1
|- style="background-color:#fcc;"
| 2
| 24 October
| Perth
| L 66–91
| Cameron Tragardh (16)
| Luke Nevill (8)
| Matt Burston (3)
| State Netball Hockey Centre
| 0–2
|- style="background-color:#fcc;"
| 3
| 28 October
| @ New Zealand
| L 84–79
| Terrance Campbell (16)
| Wade Helliwell (8)
| Terrance Campbell (4)
| North Shore Events Centre
| 0–3

|- style="background-color:#fcc;"
| 4
| 7 November
| Wollongong
| L 82–86
| Terrance Campbell (21)
| Matt Burston (11)
| Terrance Campbell (5)
| State Netball Hockey Centre
| 0–4
|- style="background-color:#ffcccc;"
| 5
| 14 November
| @ Wollongong
| L 93–82
| Eric Devendorf (19)
| Luke Nevill (9)
| Eric Devendorf (4)
| WIN Entertainment Centre
| 0–5
|- style="background-color:#fcc;"
| 6
| 19 November
| Perth
| L 84–93
| Cameron Tragardh (19)
| Matt Burston (12)
| Corey Williams (10)
| State Netball Hockey Centre
| 0–6
|- style="background-color:#cfc;"
| 7
| 21 November
| @ Gold Coast
| W 82–85
| Corey Williams (19)
| Tommy Greer (12)
| Tragardh, Williams (2)
| Gold Coast Convention Centre
| 1–6
|- style="background-color:#fcc;"
| 8
| 26 November
| @ Townsville
| L 94–66
| Cameron Tragardh (15)
| Corey Williams (7)
| Corey Williams (4)
| Townsville Entertainment Centre
| 1–7

|- style="background-color:#cfc;"
| 9
| 4 December
| Gold Coast
| W 82–78
| Corey Williams (24)
| Matt Burston (8)
| Corey Williams (4)
| State Netball Hockey Centre
| 2–7
|- style="background-color:#fcc;"
| 10
| 12 December
| @ Perth
| L 87–76
| Eric Devendorf (19)
| Luke Nevill (9)
| Corey Williams (6)
| Challenge Stadium
| 2–8
|- style="background-color:#fcc;"
| 11
| 18 December
| New Zealand
| L 80–90
| Corey Williams (19)
| Nevill, Williams (12)
| Burston, Nevill (3)
| State Netball Hockey Centre
| 2–9
|- style="background-color:#cfc;"
| 12
| 23 December
| @ Sydney
| W 73–82
| Eric Devendorf (23)
| Luke Nevill (15)
| Corey Williams (3)
| Sydney Entertainment Centre
| 3–9

|- style="background-color:#cfc;"
| 13
| 2 January
| Adelaide
| W 87–66
| Luke Nevill (23)
| Corey Williams (10)
| Corey Williams (11)
| State Netball Hockey Centre
| 4–9
|- style="background-color:#cfc;"
| 14
| 7 January
| @ Perth
| W 86–93
| Corey Williams (26)
| Corey Williams (8)
| Corey Williams (6)
| Challenge Stadium
| 5–9
|- style="background-color:#fcc;"
| 15
| 14 January
| @ Townsville
| L 94–78
| Corey Williams (18)
| Matt Burston (9)
| Devendorf, Williams (4)
| Townsville Entertainment Centre
| 5–10
|- style="background-color:#fcc;"
| 16
| 15 January
| @ Cairns
| L 95–74
| Corey Williams (18)
| Matt Burston (8)
| Devendorf, Helliwell (3)
| Cairns Convention Centre
| 5–11
|- style="background-color:#cfc;"
| 17
| 22 January
| Cairns
| W 83–76
| Luke Nevill (19)
| Corey Williams (7)
| Corey Williams (9)
| State Netball Hockey Centre
| 6–11
|- style="background-color:#fcc;"
| 18
| 26 January
| Sydney
| L 67–85
| Matt Burston (13)
| Corey Williams (9)
| Corey Williams (9)
| State Netball Hockey Centre
| 6–12

|- style="background-color:#cfc;"
| 19
| 6 February
| Wollongong
| W 93–72
| Corey Williams (19)
| Matt Burston (10)
| Corey Williams (11)
| State Netball Hockey Centre
| 7–12
|- style="background-color:#fcc;"
| 20
| 11 February
| @ New Zealand
| L 101–91
| Cameron Tragardh (35)
| Burston, Tragardh (10)
| Corey Williams (6)
| North Shore Events Centre
| 7–13
|- style="background-color:#cfc;"
| 21
| 18 February
| @ Adelaide
| W 83–86
| Matt Burston (24)
| Matt Burston (13)
| Corey Williams (10)
| Adelaide Arena
| 8–13
|- style="background-color:#cfc;"
| 22
| 19 February
| Cairns
| L 70–63
| Matt Burston (19)
| Tommy Greer (10)
| Cameron Tragardh (5)
| State Netball Hockey Centre
| 9–13

|- style="background-color:#fcc;"
| 23
| 6 March
| @ Sydney
| L 95–86
| Daryl Corletto (24)
| Greer, Walker (10)
| Corey Williams (6)
| Sydney Entertainment Centre
| 9–14
|- style="background-color:#fcc;"
| 24
| 12 March
| @ Cairns
| L 79–63
| Corey Williams (19)
| Matt Burston (11)
| Corey Williams (7)
| Cairns Convention Centre
| 9–15
|- style="background-color:#cfc;"
| 25
| 18 March
| @ Adelaide
| W 76–79
| Daryl Corletto (22)
| Burston, Williams (6)
| Corey Williams (5)
| Adelaide Arena
| 10–15
|- style="background-color:#fcc;"
| 26
| 20 March
| Gold Coast
| L 81–82
| Corey Williams (25)
| Corey Williams (11)
| Corey Williams (7)
| State Netball Hockey Centre
| 10–16
|- style="background-color:#fcc;"
| 27
| 25 March
| Townsville
| L 72–82
| Corey Williams (17)
| Lucas Walker (10)
| Corey Williams (6)
| State Netball Hockey Centre
| 10–17

|- style="background-color:#fcc;"
| 28
| 2 April
| @ New Zealand
| L 74–87
| Corletto, Tragardh (15)
| Wade Helliwell (5)
| Corey Williams (8)
| State Netball Hockey Centre
| 10–18

Player statistics

Regular season

Awards

Player of the Week 
 Round 8: Corey Williams – 24 points, 7 rebounds, 4 assists and 1 steal vs. Gold Coast Blaze @ State Netball and Hockey Centre

Melbourne Tigers Awards 
 Most Valuable Player: Corey Williams

See also
2010–11 NBL season

References

External links
Official Site of the Tigers

Melbourne United seasons
Melbourne
Melbourne United